Teen Angel was an American fantasy sitcom that aired as part of ABC's TGIF Friday night lineup from September 26, 1997, to February 13, 1998. It stars Corbin Allred as a high school student whose recently deceased best friend, played by Mike Damus, returns to earth as his guardian angel. The series was created by Al Jean and Mike Reiss.

Synopsis
Teen Angel follows a high school boy, Steve Beauchamp (Corbin Allred), and his recently deceased best friend, Marty DePolo (Mike Damus), who dies from eating a six-month-old hamburger from under Steve's bed on a dare and is then sent back to Earth as Steve's guardian angel. Marty's guide is a large disembodied head named Rod (Ron Glass), who identifies himself as God's cousin (a running gag throughout the series is that Rod is mistaken for God himself). Maureen McCormick, who played Steve's mother, Judy, left the series halfway through its run.

Marty, as a supernatural being, would frequently break the fourth wall. For instance, prior to the opening credits of the episode "Grumpy Young Men", Marty explained the absence of Steve's mother and the return of his father to the viewers.

Reception and cancellation
The series was created and placed in the TGIF lineup by ABC in an attempt to capitalize on the success of another ABC supernatural series, Sabrina the Teenage Witch. Along with Sabrina and the also-new You Wish, Teen Angel was one of three supernatural-themed sitcoms on the TGIF block that season.

At the time of the series airing, TGIF had already begun to decline (as a result of direct competition against the CBS Block Party during that season and the new Disney ownership). You Wish was canceled after only thirteen episodes, and while Teen Angel lasted more or less a full season, it was also canceled after 17 episodes.

Cast

 Mike Damus as Marty DePolo
 Corbin Allred as Steve Beauchamp
 Ron Glass as Rod, God's Cousin
 Maureen McCormick as Judy Beauchamp
 Tommy Hinkley as Casey Beauchamp
 Katie Volding as Katie Beauchamp
 Jordan Brower as Jorden Lubell
 Conchata Ferrell as Aunt Pam
 Jerry Van Dyke as Grandpa Jerry Beauchamp

Episodes

Awards and nominations

See also
Out of the Blue (1979 TV series) – one of many spin-off sitcoms connected to the sitcom Happy Days.
Teen Angel (1989 TV series) – teen drama, aired by The Disney Channel.

References

External links

1990s American high school television series
1990s American teen sitcoms
1997 American television series debuts
1998 American television series endings
American Broadcasting Company original programming
American fantasy television series
English-language television shows
Television series about angels
Television series by ABC Studios
TGIF (TV programming block)
Angels in television
Television series about teenagers
Television shows set in Detroit